Vigilant can refer to:

Ships
 Vigilant (1790s Baltimore schooner), an American schooner that carried the mail and passenger traffic in the Danish West Indies for 130 years
 Vigilant (S 618), a French Navy ballistic missile submarine
 Vigilant (yacht), an American yacht, the winner of the 1893 America's Cup yacht race
 CGS Vigilant, a Canadian armed third-class cruiser and Great Lakes fisheries protection vessel
 [[HMC Vigilant|HMC Vigilant]], a British customs cutter of HM Customs and Excise
 HMRC Vigilant, two ships and a number of cutters of the British HM Customs and Excise
 HMS Vigilant, a number of ships of the British Royal Navy
 HSV Vigilant (JHSV-2), a ship of the United States Navy-led joint high-speed vessel program, later renamed 
 , more than one ship of the United States Coast Guard
 , more than one ship of the United States Revenue-Marine and United States Revenue Cutter Service
 , more than one ship of the United States Navy
 Vigilant (Alexandria fireboat), operated by the Alexandria Fire Department

Other
 Vigilant (novel), a 1999 novel by James Alan Gardner
 The Vigilant'', a 1960s English-language newspaper published in Khartoum, Sudan
 Vigilant behavior, a personality trait
 Grob Vigilant, a glider manufactured by Grob Aerospace of Mindelheim Mattsies of Germany
 Vickers Vigilant, a British Army anti-tank guided missile

See also 

 
 
 Vigilance (disambiguation)
 Vigilante (disambiguation)